A pendulum is a body suspended from a fixed support so that it swings freely back and forth under the influence of gravity.

Pendulum may also refer to:

Devices
 Pendulum (mathematics), the mathematical principles of a pendulum
 Pendulum clock, a kind of clock that uses a pendulum to keep time
 Pendulum car, an experimental tilting train
 Foucault pendulum, a pendulum that demonstrates the Earth's rotation
 Spherical pendulum
 Spring pendulum
 Conical pendulum
 Centrifugal pendulum absorber, torsional vibration reduction by using a pendulum principle
 For other types and uses of pendulums, see: :Category:Pendulums
 Mackerras Pendulum, a model devised by Malcolm Mackerras to predict election outcomes
 Pendulum (torture device), a device allegedly used by the Spanish Inquisition
 Pendulum Instruments, a Swedish manufacturer of scientific instruments

Music
 Pendulum (Australian band), an Australian electronic rock group formed in 2002
 Pendulum (ambient band), an Australian house music group formed in 1994

Albums
 Pendulum (Broadcast EP), and its title track
 Pendulum (Creedence Clearwater Revival album)
 Pendulum (Dave Liebman album), and its title track
 Pendulum (Eberhard Weber album), and its title track
 Pendulum (Lowen & Navarro album), and its title track
 Pendulum (Tara Simmons EP), and its title track
 The Pendulum, a comic book miniseries based on Insane Clown Posse's Dark Carnival universe, and associated songs and album

Songs
 "Pendulum" (song), by FKA Twigs
 "Pendulum", by Embodyment from the album The Narrow Scope of Things
 "Pendulum", by Katy Perry from the album Witness
 "Pendulum", by Phinehas from the album Thegodmachine
 "Pendulums", by Sarah Harmer from the album All of Our Names

 "Penduli Pendulum", by Bobbie Gentry from The Delta Sweete
 "The Pendulum Song", song written by Al Hoffman and John Murray
 Pendulum Music, a composition by Steve Reich involving microphones swinging above speakers like pendulums

Books and periodicals 
Pendulum, by John Christopher, 1968 
The Pendulum, by Annie S. Swan, 1972 
Pendulum, by A. E. Van Vogt, 1978
Pendulum, by Adam Hamdy, 2017
The Pendulum, a student newspaper at Elon University
The Pendulum, a publication devoted to radiesthesia

Film
Pendulum (1969 film), an American neo noir film starring George Peppard
Pendulum, a 2001 film starring Rachel Hunter and James Russo
Pendulum (2014 film), an Indian neo noir

Other
 Pendulum, a trade name for the preemergent herbicide pendimethalin
 Pendulum, several types of Digimon virtual pets
 Mackerras pendulum, an electoral tool for describing the swing required for a change of government

See also